Sir Elliot Charles Bovill (23 April 1848 – 24 March 1893) was a British lawyer and judge. He served as Chief Justice of Cyprus and the Straits Settlements in the late 19th century.

Early life
Bovill was born in Clapham, at that time in Surrey, the fourth son of William Bovill, often confused with William John Bovill QC of Lincoln's Inn, and his wife, Lavinia Ann I'Anson, daughter of architect Edward I'Anson. He was educated at Westminster School and Christ Church, Oxford, graduating from the latter with honours in 1871. He was called to the Bar at Lincoln's Inn in 1873.

He married Anna White, the daughter of John Tahourdin White on 27 July 1876 at Kensington.

Legal appointments
Bovill was appointed assistant Judicial Commissioner in Cyprus in 1875 soon after its cessation from Turkey to Britain. He was legal adviser to the government (the predecessor position to King's Advocate) from 1877 to 1881. He was appointed Judicial Commissioner in 1881 and Chief Justice in 1883 on creation of that position. He was knighted the following year, in 1884.

In 1890, it was reported that he was to be appointed Chief Justice of Western Australia. He declined the appointment. Instead, in 1892, he was appointed Chief Justice of the Straits Settlements on the departure of Edward Loughlin O'Malley. He first sat as Chief Justice in October 1892. His family made up of his wife and two boys and a daughter remained in Cyprus, planning to join him in Singapore later.

Death

Bovill died at the age of 45 of cholera on 24 March 1893 at his residence in Paterson Road, Singapore, after returning from a trip to Malacca. He was buried at the Bukit Timah Cemetery. 

His gravestone was moved to Fort Canning Green when the Bukit Timah Cemetery was closed. There is a commemorative plaque placed by Bovill's widow in St Andrew's Cathedral, Singapore.

References

 

1848 births
1893 deaths
People from Clapham
People educated at Westminster School, London
Alumni of Christ Church, Oxford
Members of Lincoln's Inn
Chief Justices of the Straits Settlements
Deaths from cholera
English barristers
Knights Bachelor
Lawyers awarded knighthoods
British Cyprus judges
19th-century English lawyers